John Alkin (born 17 January 1947) is an English actor turned spiritual healer. He was born in Rugby, Warwickshire, under the name John Kenneth Foinquinos.

Alkin is best remembered for two roles: DS Tom Daniels in The Sweeney and barrister Barry Deeley in the long running daytime TV drama Crown Court. He played the role of Robert Martin in the 1972 BBC TV production of Jane Austen's Emma.  He also appeared extensively as a guest star in numerous TV shows such as Z-Cars, Timeslip, Minder, The Sandbaggers and Doctor Who.

He left acting in the mid-1980s to set up a spiritual healing centre with his second wife, Lee Everett Alkin, former wife of DJ and TV comic Kenny Everett.

Filmography

References

External links
 

English male television actors
1947 births
Living people
People from Rugby, Warwickshire